Jethi Bahurani is mountain in the Himalayas of Nepal. Located in Darchula District, it has a summit elevation of 6,850 meters above sea level.

See also
 List of mountains in Nepal
 List of Ultras of the Himalayas

References

External links
 "Jethi Bahurani, Nepal" on Peakbagger

Six-thousanders of the Himalayas
Mountains of the Sudurpashchim Province